Francis Joseph Morrissey (March 11, 1899 – November 19, 1968) was an American football player and coach. He played college football at Boston College from 1917 and 1920 and served as head football coach in 1918.

Morrissey was born in Boston, Massachusetts.  After graduating from Medford High School in Medford, Massachusetts, he played football for the Boston College Eagles from 1917 to 1920. Morrissey was the captain of the varsity team from 1918 to 1920 and served as head coach in 1918 when Charles Brickley left BC to join the United States Navy Reserve. Morrissey also played baseball and ice hockey as Boston College.

Morrissey died on November 19, 1968, at Lankenau Hospital in Wynnewood, Pennsylvania.

Head coaching record

References

External links
 

1899 births
1968 deaths
American football guards
American football tackles
Boston College Eagles baseball players
Boston College Eagles football coaches
Boston College Eagles football players
Boston College Eagles men's ice hockey players
Buffalo All-Americans players
Buffalo Bisons (NFL) players
Canisius Golden Griffins football coaches
Milwaukee Badgers players
Rochester Jeffersons players
Tonawanda Kardex players
Sportspeople from Boston
Sportspeople from Medford, Massachusetts
Coaches of American football from Massachusetts
Players of American football from Boston
Baseball players from Boston
Ice hockey people from Boston